Uchhali Complex is located in Khushab District, Punjab, Pakistan.  Uchhali Complex includes three brackish to saline lakes: Khabikki Lake, Uchhali Lake and Jahlar Lakes. It was designated a Ramsar site on March 22, 1996.

Fauna and flora
Ucchali Complex is the only conservation supporting the winter migratory flocks of White-headed duck in Pakistan, along with it the complex also is a home for three other species; Cinereous vulture, Eastern imperial eagle and sociable lapwing. Other migratory species in the wetlands include; Greater flamingo, pied harrier, greylag goose and ferruginous duck.

References

Ramsar sites in Pakistan
Khushab District